Pavel Petrovich Korovkin (the family name is also transliterated as Korowkin in German sources), (9 July 1913 – 11 August 1985) was a Soviet mathematician whose main fields of research were orthogonal polynomials, approximation theory and potential theory. In 1947 he proved a generalization of Egorov's theorem: from the early 1950s on, his research interests turned to functional analysis and he examined the stability of the exterior Dirichlet problem and the convergence and approximation properties of linear positive operators on spaces of continuous functions. The set of terms and Korovkin approximation are named after him.

Life and career
Korovkin was born to a poor peasant family. He lost his father early and grew from 1914 to 1920 at an orphanage. In 1930 he graduated high school in Leningrad. As the winner of a mathematics contest he had a right to enter the Leningrad State University without entrance exams. After a year of working at a factory he entered the Faculty of Mathematics and Mechanics. His scientific advisor was V.I. Smirnov. Korovkin earned his doctorate in 1939 with a dissertation on orthogonal polynomials. He then was appointed to Kalinin Pedagogical Institute.

At the beginning of Great Patriotic War Korovkin voluntarily enlisted to the Red Army. He started as a cannon platoon chief and till the end of war promoted to artillery regiment chief.  He was awarded  with Order of the Red Star.

In December 1945, he continued his work at the Kalinin Pedagogical Institute, in 1947 with a thesis on convergence of polynomial sequences, and was appointed professor in 1948. At the Moscow Automobile and Road Institute from 1958 to 1970 he headed the department of higher mathematics, then he became head of the Department of Mathematical Analysis at the Kaluga State Pedagogical Institute.

Selected publications
.

Notes

References

Biographical and general references
. The "Mathematics in the USSR during its first forty years 1917–1957 is an opus in two volumes describing the developments of Soviet mathematics during the first forty years of its existence. This is the first volume, titled "Survey articles" and consists exactly of such kind of articles authored by Soviet experts and reviewing briefly the contributions of Soviet mathematicians to a chosen field, during the years from 1917 to 1957.
. The "Mathematics in the USSR during its first forty years 1917–1957 is an opus in two volumes describing the developments of Soviet mathematics during the first forty years of its existence. This is the second volume, titled "Biobibliography" (evidently an acronym of biography and bibliography), containing a complete bibliography of works published by Soviet mathematicians during that period, alphabetically ordered with respect to author's surname and including, when possible, brief but complete biographies of the authors.
. The "Mathematics in the USSR 1958–1967" is a two–volume continuation of the opus "Mathematics in the USSR during its first forty years 1917–1957" and describes the developments of Soviet mathematics during the period 1958–1967. Precisely it is meant as a continuation of the second volume of that work and, as such, is titled "Biobibliography" (evidently an acronym of biography and bibliography). It includes new biographies (when possible, brief and complete) and bibliographies of works published by new Soviet mathematicians during that period, and updates on the work and biographies of scientist included in the former volume, alphabetically ordered with respect to author's surname.

Scientific references
.

1913 births
People from Vesyegonsky District
Approximation theorists
Soviet mathematicians
1985 deaths